Topper is an occupational surname, originally denoting "a person connected with spinning of flax or wool".

Notable persons and characters with this name include:

People
Burt Topper (1928–2007), American film director and screenwriter best known for cult films aimed at teenagers
Curt Topper, Pennsylvania Secretary of General Services from 2015
Hertha Töpper (1924–2020), Austrian operatic contralto and voice teacher
Jesse Topper (born 1981), American politician
Steve Topper (born 1961), Australian former professional rugby league footballer, brother of Stuart Topper
Stuart Topper (born 1971), Australian former professional rugby league footballer, brother of Steve Topper
Uwe Topper (born 1940), German non-fiction author

Fictional characters
Bud Topper, one of the main characters in the television series Noddy

Low German surnames
Occupational surnames
English-language occupational surnames